Jean Coulthard,  (February 10, 1908 – March 9, 2000) was a Canadian composer and music educator. She was one of a trio of women composers who dominated Western Canadian music in the twentieth century: Coulthard, Barbara Pentland, and Violet Archer. All three died within weeks of each other in 2000. Her own work might be loosely termed "prematurely neo-Romantic", as the orthodox serialists who dominated academic musical life in North America during the 1950s and 1960s had little use for her. Some of her well-known compositions include Cradle Song, Threnody, Canadian Fantasy, Ballade "A Winter's Tale" and her opera Return of the Native.

Life and career
Born in Vancouver, British Columbia, Coulthard was the daughter of Jean Blake Robinson Coulthard, a prominent and influential music teacher in Vancouver. Through her mother she received her earliest musical training and was introduced at an early age to the work of French composers like Claude Debussy and Maurice Ravel, both of whom were lifelong influences. From 1924-1928 she studied the piano with Jan Cherniavsky and music theory with Frederick Chubb. A scholarship from the Vancouver Woman's Musical Club enabled her to pursue studies at the Royal College of Music in 1928-1929 where she was a pupil of Kathleen Long, R.O. Morris, and Ralph Vaughan Williams. She studied in the 1930s and early 1940s with such composers as Béla Bartók, Aaron Copland, and Arnold Schoenberg. In 1944-1945, Coulthard worked for an entire academic year with Bernard Wagenaar of the Juilliard School, New York. In 1948 she met the British composer Elizabeth Poston (who was visiting Canada) and they began a long friendship and an extensive correspondence over the next 30 years. 

Beginning in 1925, Coulthard taught the piano privately in her mother's studio, and then as an independent teacher (1935–1947). In 1947 she joined the fledgling Department of Music in the Faculty of Arts of the University of British Columbia. The head of the department, Harry Adaskin, hired first Coulthard, and then (in 1949) Barbara Pentland, to teach theory and composition. Coulthard taught composition in the department, and later (from 1967) in the administratively distinct UBC School of Music (1967–1973). In 1956-7, she spent a year in Paris and in Roquebrune, southern France, beginning an opera and completing several substantial chamber and vocal works. A later sabbatical in London permitted Coulthard to work in a sustained way with Gordon Jacob, the British composer and orchestrator.

Coulthard's composition students included Canadian composers Chan Ka Nin, Michael Conway Baker, Sylvia Rickard, Ernst Schneider, Robert Knox, Jean Ethridge, Joan Hansen, David Gordon Duke, Lloyd Burritt and Frederick Schipizky.

In 1978, she was made an Officer of the Order of Canada. In 1994, she was awarded the Order of British Columbia. Her work was also part of the music event in the art competition at the 1948 Summer Olympics.

Principal works
 4 Studies for piano (1945)
 Sonata for piano (1947)
 Sonata for cello and piano (1947)
 String Quartet No. 1 (1948)
 Symphony No. 1 (1950)
 Variations on BACH (1951)
 Sonata in duet for violin and piano (1952)
 A Prayer for Elizabeth for Strings (1953)
 String Quartet No. 2 Threnody (1954, rev. 1969)
 12 Preludes (1954–1964)
 Violin Concerto (1959)
 Sonata Rhapsody, for viola and piano (1962)
 6 Medieval Songs, for baritone and piano (1962)
 Piano Concerto (1963, rev. 1967)
 Endymion, symphonic poem (1964)
 Choral symphony This land (Symphony No. 2) for choir and orchestra (1967)
 Lyric trio, for piano, violin and cello (1968)
 Divertimento, for horn, bassoon and piano (1968)
 Lyric sonatina, for bassoon and piano (1971)
 Octet (double string quartet) (1972)
 Lyric Symphony (No. 3) for bassoon and orchestra (1975)
 Burlesca, for piano and orchestra (1977)
 Symphonic Ode, for viola and orchestra (1977)
 Autumn Symphony (No. 4), for String orchestra (1984)
 Symphonic Image Vision of the North, for String orchestra (1989)

References

 Kydd, Roseanne. 1992. "Jean Coulthard: A Revised View." SoundNotes. SN2:14-24.

External links
Jean Coulthard: Showcase at the Canadian Music Centre.
Jean Coulthard fonds at the University of British Columbia.

Further reading
A short biography for students, Jean Coulthard: A Life in Music by William Bruneau & David Gordon Duke, was published by Ronsdale Press in 2005.

See also 
 Music of Canada
 List of Canadian composers

1908 births
2000 deaths
Canadian music academics
Canadian classical composers
Members of the Order of British Columbia
Officers of the Order of Canada
Musicians from Vancouver
Women classical composers
Pupils of Darius Milhaud
20th-century classical composers
20th-century Canadian composers
20th-century musicologists
20th-century women composers
Olympic competitors in art competitions